David Ezekiel Bryant (October 19, 1849 – February 5, 1910) was a United States district judge of the United States District Court for the Eastern District of Texas.

Education and career
Born in LaRue County, Kentucky, Bryant received an Artium Baccalaureus degree from Trinity College (now Duke University) in 1871, and read law to enter the bar in 1873. He was in private practice in Sherman, Texas, from 1873 to 1890.

Federal judicial service
On May 3, 1890, Bryant was nominated by President Benjamin Harrison to a seat on the United States District Court for the Eastern District of Texas vacated by Judge Chauncey Brewer Sabin. Bryant was confirmed by the United States Senate on May 27, 1890, and received his commission the same day, serving thereafter until his death on February 5, 1910, in Sherman.

References

Sources
 

1845 births
1910 deaths
Judges of the United States District Court for the Eastern District of Texas
United States federal judges appointed by Benjamin Harrison
19th-century American judges
19th-century American politicians
United States federal judges admitted to the practice of law by reading law